The Lura Building on W. Main St. in Mayville, North Dakota was built in 1900.  It has also been known as Peterson Furniture Store.  It was listed on the National Register of Historic Places in 1985.

References

Commercial buildings on the National Register of Historic Places in North Dakota
Commercial buildings completed in 1900
National Register of Historic Places in Traill County, North Dakota
1900 establishments in North Dakota
Mayville, North Dakota